Croxley Green railway station is a disused terminus between Rickmansworth and Watford on the A412 road at the end of a short branch line.

History
The station was opened in 1912 by the London and North Western Railway as the terminus of the branch line of the Watford-Rickmansworth line. The original wooden station building was burned in the early hours of 10 March 1913 by a group of Suffragettes. A goods yard opened just to the east of the station shortly after, which by 1939 it was expanded and a loop constructed from the southern to the northern siding.

The London Midland Region of British Railways, and later Network SouthEast after sectorisation, continued to run services until 1996. Not far from the terminus, a depot was built to maintain BR trains, and for stabling 1938 tube stock Bakerloo line trains which closed in 1985. Seven years before closure, the original platform was removed due to safety concerns in 1989 and a wooden platform was built on the other side of the track.

Originally, there were some services direct to Broad Street and Euston. The station and branch line were earmarked for closure by the first Beeching report, but as the proposal was refused, the southern curve of the triangle junction was instead closed, so the shuttle to Watford Junction remained. After attempts of reviving passenger usage on the branch line, services were reduced to a parliamentary train. The last train ran on 22 March 1996 and the line and station were closed, supposedly temporarily; the station furniture, including the lighting and the wooden platform remained in situ. A substitute bus service commenced on 25th March.

A section of the embankment just east of the Grand Union Canal bridge was removed to make way for a new Ascot Road to improve traffic flow to the nearby business park. It was considered uneconomical to bridge the road, and so the station remains breached from the rest of the line. The Department of Transport authorised permanent closure in a letter dated November 2002. Both the station and the line were permanently closed on 29 September 2003. In 2005, the wooden platform was in a serious state of decay and was removed.

Today, little of the station furniture remains and the station is almost completely overgrown. The original track is still in place, though all electrical equipment has been removed. The station gates have fallen into disrepair, and have been replaced with temporary security fencing. Steps up to platform level are still in-place with their handrails, alongside the faded Network Southeast-red lamp posts. Access to the viaduct across the Grand Union Canal is restricted with permanent fencing and locked gates.

References

External links
London's Abandoned Stations - Croxley Green branch
Disused Stations - Croxley Green
Pictures taken by the West Watford History Group showing the line, including Croxley Green station, shortly before and shortly after closure
Pictures of the Croxley line, including Croxley Green station, taken in 2009

Disused railway stations in Hertfordshire
Railway stations in Great Britain opened in 1912
Railway stations in Great Britain closed in 1996
1912 establishments in England
1996 disestablishments in England
Former London and North Western Railway stations
Croxley Rail Link